The Herpetological Conservation Trust (HCT) was a British wildlife charity for the conservation of herpetofauna: amphibians and reptiles.  It was founded in 1989 by Vincent Weir and Ian Swingland of DICE and launched at the First World Congress of Herpetology in Canterbury that year. In July 2009, HCT evolved into Amphibian and Reptile Conservation, a new voice for conserving frogs, toads, newts, snakes and lizards.

References

External links
 Official website

Herpetology organizations
Animal charities based in the United Kingdom
Environmental organisations based in the United Kingdom
Environmental organizations established in 1989
1989 establishments in the United Kingdom